Gaston N'Ganga-Muivi  was a Congolese football player who played for People's Republic of the Congo in the 1978 African Cup of Nations.

External links
11v11 Profile

Year of birth missing (living people)
Living people
Republic of the Congo footballers
Republic of the Congo international footballers
1974 African Cup of Nations players
1978 African Cup of Nations players
CARA Brazzaville players
Association football defenders